is a Japanese manga series written and illustrated by Nica Saida. It was serialized in Shogakukan's seinen manga magazine Hibana from April 2016 to June 2017, with its chapters collected in two tankōbon volumes.

Publication
Written and illustrated by Nica Saida, Benten Botan was serialized in Shogakukan's seinen manga magazine Hibana from April 7, 2016, to June 7, 2017. Shogakukan collected its chapters in two tankōbon volumes, released on November 11, 2016, and September 12, 2017.

Volume list

References

Further reading

External links
 

Seinen manga
Shogakukan manga